Godfrey Shew House is a historic home located at Fish House in Fulton County, New York. It was built in 1784 and is a 2-story, five-bay-wide and two-bay-deep, timber-frame, gable-roofed residence in the Federal style.  Attached to the main block is a 1-story wing.  It features a 1-story entrance porch supported by four Tuscan columns. Also on the property is a -story carriage house dating to about 1885.

It was listed on the National Register of Historic Places in 2006.

References

Houses on the National Register of Historic Places in New York (state)
Federal architecture in New York (state)
Houses completed in 1784
Houses in Fulton County, New York
National Register of Historic Places in Fulton County, New York